The seventh season of Teenage Mutant Ninja Turtles chronologically begins where Episode 142 left off. The Technodrome is still located at the bottom of the Arctic Ocean until the last episode, when it is sent back to Dimension X for the third and final time. However the sideseason takes place during season 4, while the Technodrome is on the Volcanic Asteroid in Dimension X. These episodes were produced before Season 4 and aired in 1993 on the USA Cartoon Express. In Ireland, they aired in 1990 placed between seasons 4 and 5.

The more educational-based nature of the "Vacation in Europe" episodes allowed the use of Christian references. For example, Leonardo da Vinci's painting The Last Supper is seen in "Artless", set in Italy, while "Ring of Fire", set in Portugal, shows a Roman Catholic cathedral, complete with crosses, while crosses in general are avoided in the codes of US children's cartoons otherwise.

Episodes

DVD release 

For the 23 disc DVD set of all 10 seasons these episodes are listed as Episodes 14 - 20 on discs 19 and 20 of the 2012 collector's edition after the Vacation In Europe side season. Vacation in Europe was released on discs 17 and 18 of the 2012 DVD collection edition. Discs 17 - 20 are Season 7 in the collector's set.

References

External links
TV Com

Teenage Mutant Ninja Turtles (1987 TV series) seasons
1992 American television seasons
1993 American television seasons
Television episodes set in Japan
Time travel in television